Chronos Ruler is a Taiwanese manhua series written and illustrated by Ponjea. It has also been serialized online via Shueisha's digital publication Shōnen Jump+ from March 2015 to February 2018. An anime television series adaptation by Project No.9 aired from July 7 to September 29, 2017.

Plot
The story centers on "Chronos Rulers," those who fight the time-eating demons that appear when people wish they could turn back time. The Chronos Rulers fight a time-manipulation battle against these demons.

Characters

Victo is a 39 year old man who looks a lot younger as after the supposed death of his wife he made a deal with a Horologue, losing part of his time. That is why he now seeks to recover his lost time. At first he did not believe that Mina is his wife but then begins to suspect that she could in fact be his wife. As Chronos Ruler he is able to control the cards at will, he is also in a UNIQUE position that allows him to use his powers without exhausting his time, due to the curse that the Horologue put on him when making the deal.

Kiri is the son of Victor Putin and Mina Putin, he helps his father to recover his lost time. Like his father he did not believe that Mina could be his mother because he remembered his mother like Nana not Mina, but then like Victor he begins to suspect that she could be his mother. As Chronos Ruler, he is able to control water and he is also able to use a sword as a personal weapon. Due to him being the son of Mina, since she is a descendant of Chronos, he will not grow old.

She is the wife of Victor Putin and mother of Kiri Putin, she believed herself dead but due to Victor's treatment she returns to life but like him she loses part of her time. At first she thought that she was only Victor's lover because she did not remember that she was married to him, nor did she remember that Kiri was her son, even though she cared about him. As a Chronos Ruler she is able to control the air. Due to being a direct descendant of Chronos her appearance does not change, even after having her time stolen, and why she looks like a young woman of 18 (although in the manga she looks younger) but then it is discovered that she may not have wasted her time after all.

Blaze is 16, but in the manga he is 25, as a child he was a kind child who tried to help others but because his childhood friend was deceived, the villagers they thought that he was pretending to be a good boy, that's why he became the most evil person in the world, even though he is still young who likes to help his friends when necessary, he considers himself as Kiri's older brother, as Chronos Ruler is able to control the fire.

Media

Anime
On December 17, 2016, it was announced that an anime television series adaptation would be produced by Project No.9. It aired from July 7 to September 29, 2017. The series is directed by Masato Matsune and Michiko Yokote handled the series composition. Hiroya Iijima designed the characters, while Haruo Miyagawa is the prop designer. Crunchyroll streamed the series. Funimation has licensed the series.

Notes

References

External links
 

2017 anime television series debuts
Action anime and manga
Anime series based on manga
Funimation
Japanese webcomics
Project No.9
Shōnen manga
Shueisha manga